In the Middle Ages, a familiaris (plural familiares), more formally a familiaris regis ("familiar of the king") or familiaris curiae ("of the court"), was, in the words of the historian W. L. Warren, "an intimate, a familiar resident or visitor in the [royal] household, a member of the familia, that wider family which embraces servants, confidents, and close associates." Warren adds that the term "defies adequate translation", but is distinct from courtier, "for the king employed his familiares on a variety of administrative tasks."

The familiares of a king are collectively referred to as the familia regis, which evolved into a private royal council—in England during the reign of Henry III (1216–72) and in France during that of Philip V (1316–22). In England, it was known as the concilium familiare or concilium privatum (Privy Council) and in France as the magnum consilium (great council, the Conseil du Roi). The familiares regis may have already formed an inner royal council in Sicily during the reign of Roger II (1130–54).

Notes

Sources

Further reading

Bournazel, Eric. Le Gouvernement Capétien au XIIe siècle, 1108–1180: Structures sociales et mutations institutionelles. Paris: 1975.
Chalandon, F. Histoire de la domination normande en Italie et Sicile. 2 vols. Paris: 1907.
Chibnall, M. "Mercenaries and the Familia regis under Henry I". History 62 (1977), 15–23.
Garufi, C. A. "Sull'ordinamento amministrativo normanno in Sicilia, Exchiquier o diwan? Studi storico diplomatici". Archivio storico italiano, 5th series, 27 (1901), 225–63.
Green, Judith A. The Government of England under Henry I. Cambridge: 1986.
Hollister, C. W. The Military Organization of Norman England. Oxford: 1965.
Jolliffe, J. E. A. Angevin Kingship. New York: 1955.
Olivier-Martin, François. Histoire du droit français des origines à la Révolution. 2nd ed. Paris: 1951.
Warren, W. L. Henry II. Berkeley: 1973.
Warren, W. L. The Governance of Norman and Angevin England, 1086–1272. London: 1987.

Medieval occupations